The Centers for Disease Control and Prevention is the national public health agency of the United States.

CDC may also refer to:

Organizations

Government
 Korea Centers for Disease Control and Prevention, a South Korean agency
 Taiwan Centers for Disease Control
 Chinese Center for Disease Control and Prevention
 Civil Defence Corps, UK, 1949-1968 
 Community Development Council, Singapore
 Community of Democratic Choice, of Eastern European countries
 Canadian Dairy Commission
 Chichester District Council, local authority in West Sussex, England
 Colonial Defence Committee, a body advising on the military defence of the British Empire, 1885-1908

Politics
 Congress for Democratic Change, a Liberian political party
 Democratic Convergence of Catalonia, a political party in Catalonia, Spain 1974–2016
 California Democratic Council, US

Associations
 Coalition to Diversify Computing, a joint organization of the Association for Computing Machinery (ACM) and the Computing Research Association (CRA)

Non-profit
 Community development corporation, any non-profit organization that promotes and supports a community
 Certified Development Company, a U.S. Small Business Administration program designed to provide financing for the purchase of fixed assets
 Commission for Developing Countries, a Commission of the International Mathematical Union

Business
  ("Deposits and Consignments Fund"), a financial institution owned by the French government
 CDC Group, formerly the Commonwealth Development Corporation and Colonial Development Corporation, a British development organisation owned by the UK Government
 Cameroon Development Corporation, an agribusiness company located in Limbe, Cameroon
 Central Depository Company, a Pakistani central securities depository company 
 Control Data Corporation, former supercomputer company
 ComfortDelGro Australia, a major Australian operator of buses formerly named ComfortDelGro Cabcharge
 Construction Data Company, also known as CDC News and CDC Publishing, a commercial construction reporting service
 Loong Air, by ICAO code

Sport

 Cricket Discipline Commission (of the England and Wales Cricket Board)

Other organizations
 Cult of the Dead Cow (cDc), a computer hacker and DIY media organization

Places
 Center Day Camp, North Windham, Maine, U.S.
 ,  library in  Quebec, Canada
 Communicable Disease Centre, former hospital in Novena, Singapore
 Cedar City Regional Airport, by IATA code

Science
 Cholesterol-dependent cytolysin,  exotoxins secreted by bacteria
 Cell-division cycle in biology
cdc20
cdc25
Cdc42, cell-division cycle protein 
 Complement-dependent cytotoxicity
 Conventional dendritic cell, cDC
 Cross dehydrogenative coupling

Technology
 Change data capture, to track changed data
 Clock domain crossing of a signal
 Connected Device Configuration, of required Java ME features
 Communications daughter card for notebook computers
 Carbide-derived carbon
 USB communications device class

Other uses
 CDC?, a children's book by William Steig
 Chef de cuisine
 Combat Direction Center of an aircraft carrier
 Cul de canard, duck feathers used in fly fishing
 Continuous Discharge Certificate, seafarer's identity document

See also
 C.DC., the Swiss botany author abbreviation of Anne Casimir de Candolle
 Africa CDC (Centres for Disease Control and Prevention)